Palanpur is a city and a municipality of Banaskantha district in the Indian state of Gujarat. Palanpur is the administrative headquarters of Banaskantha district. Palanpur is the ancestral home to an industry of Indian diamond merchants.

Etymology
Palanpur in early times is said to have been called Prahladana Patan or Prahaladanapura after its founder Prahladana, mentioned in Jain texts. It was afterwards re-peopled by Palansi Chauhan from whom it took its modern name. Others say that it was founded by Pal Parmar whose brother Jagadev founded nearby Jagana village.

History

The Jain texts mentions that Prahladana, brother of Paramara Dharavarsha of Abu, founded Prahladanapur in 1218 and built Prahladana-vihara dedicated to Pallaviya Parshwanatha. The town was re-peopled ruled by Chauhans around thirteenth century. At the start of the seventeenth century, the Palanpur State was taken over by Jhalori dynasty of the Pashtun Lohani tribe which was founded in 1373 and ruled from Jalore (Rajasthan). The dynasty came into historical prominence during the period of instability that followed the demise of Mughal emperor Aurangzeb in the early 18th century. It was overrun soon afterwards by the Marathas; the Lohanis followed the trend of seeking recourse in the British East India Company against them and finally entered the subsidiary alliance system in 1817, along with all other neighbouring states, becoming a British protectorate. After independence of India in 1947, Palanpur State was dissolved in 1949 and merged with Union of India as a part of Bombay State. Subsequently Palanpur became the capital of Banaskantha district of Gujarat.

Geography and climate
It has an average elevation of 209 metres (685 ft).

Demographics

In the 2011 Census of India, Palanpur had a population of 141,592. Males constitute 53% of the population and females 47%. Palanpur has an average literacy rate of 86%, higher than the national average of 59.5%: male literacy is 94%, and female literacy is 78%. In Palanpur, 13% of the population is under 6 years of age.

Places of interest

In 1750 (Samvat 1806), Bahadur Khan built a brick and mortar city-wall, the Nagarkot of Palanpur. It was 3 miles round, 17 to 20 feet high and 6 feet broad with seven bastioned gateways, and, at the corners, round towers armed with guns. The gateways of the city-walls were Delhi Darwaja, Gathaman Darwaja, Malan Darwaja, Mira Darwaja, Virbai Darwaja, Salempura Darwaja, Sadarpur Darwaja or Shimla Darwaja. Only Mira Darwaja survives today.

Sher Muhammad Khan attended the coronation ceremony of King George V in Delhi in 1910 and built a club named after him in 1913. In 1918, his successor Tale Muhammad Khan constructed Kirti Stambh, a 22 metre tower near the railway station commemorating the gallantry of his father and the history of town and his dynasty. He also built Balaram Palace between 1922 to 1936 and later Jorawar Palace (Currently used as Judicial Court) also. In 1939, he also built Shashivan, formerly Jahanara Baug, a garden to commemorate his second marriage with a daughter of an Australian businessman.

The old marketplaces are Nani Bazar, Moti Bazar and Dhalvas. Apart from Shahshivan, Chaman Bag is a major public garden in the town. Early Jhalori ruler Malik Mujahid Khan built Mansarovar, a lake dedicated to his queen Manbai Jadeja, in 1628.

Mithi Vav

Mithi Vav, a stepwell is the oldest surviving monument of town. It is situated in the eastern part of the town. The five storey stepwell can be entered from the west. Based on its architectural style, it is believed that it is constructed in late medieval period but the sculptures embedded in the walls may belong to earlier period. The sculptures include that of Ganesha, Shiva, Apsaras, dancing figures, worshiping couples and floral or geometrical patterns. A worn out inscription found on one sculpture embedded in left wall can not read clearly but the year Samvat 1320 ( 1263 AD) can made out.

Temples

Palanpur has several temples dedicated to Hinduism and Jainism.
Hindu Temples
The Chaulukya dynasty ruler Jayasimha Siddharaja of Anhilwad Patan is believed to be born in Palanpur. His mother Meenaldevi built Pataleshwar Temple dedicated to Shiva. Other Hindu temples are Lakshman Tekri temple, Mota Ramji Mandir, Ambaji Mata Mandir.
Jain Temples
Kirti Stambh : The 22m(72 feet) high Tower of Fame was built by a wealthy Jain merchant in the 12 century A.D. and is dedicated to Adinathji (Rishabhnatha), the first of the Tirthankaras. The tower is decorated with Jain Pantheons.
Motu Derasar : The Pallaviya Parshwanath Temple, also known as Mota Derasar, was built by King Prahaladan which is dedicated to Parshwanath, 23rd tirthankar.
Nanu Derasar

Economy
Dairy, textile, diamond polishing and marble are major industries of Palanpur. Banas Dairy is one of the largest dairy in the state. The diamond polishing and evaluation industry across India and abroad is dominated by Palanpuri Jain diaspora. Palanpuri Ittars are popular for their fragrance and earned the nickname 'city of flowers' to the town.

Education and culture
During rule of Jhalori Nawabs, Palanpur became well known for Gujarati Ghazals and poetry. Combination Samosas and Kari are popular snack in the town.

Palanpur is an educational hub of Banaskantha. Major schools include Silver Bells English medium school (c.b.s.e),Vividhlakshi Vidyamandir, Shri Ram Vidhyalaya, Aadarsh Vidhyasankool, Matrushree RV Bhatol Eng Med School, M B Karnavat School, K K Gothi Highschool. Palanpur also have various colleges: Banas Medical College, Palanpur Government Engineering College, G D Modi College of Arts, C. L. Parikh College of Commerce, R. R. Mehta College of Science. Apart from these, there are two B.C.A. colleges, B.Ed colleges, Girls Arts college.

Notable people
Several notable persons hails from Palanpur:
 Saeed Ahmad Palanpuri, Indian scholar of Islam
 Bharat Shah, a diamond merchant, Hindi film financier and 
 B. K. Gadhvi, politician
Haribhai P. Chaudhary, politician
 Chandrakant Bakshi, (1932–2006), Gujarati author.
 Pranav Mistry, computer scientist and the inventor
 Rohit Jivanlal Parikh, mathematician, logician and philosopher
 Mehul Choksi, fugitive Indian-born businessman

Palanpur is a native of the Palanpuri diamond merchants in Surat and Belgium.

Transport
The town being the headquarters of Banaskantha district is well-connected by road and rail.

Rail
Palanpur Railway Station, on the Agra-Jaipur-Ahmedabad mainline, comes under the administrative control of Western Railway zone of the Indian Railways. It has direct rail links on the broad gauge to the cities of Chennai, Thiruvananthapuram, Mysore, Bangalore, Pune, Mumbai, Jaipur, Jodhpur, Delhi, Dehradun, Muzaffarpur, Bareilly and Jammu. It is connected to most of the cities and towns in Gujarat such as Ahmedabad, Surat, Vadodra, Bhuj, Rajkot, Jamnagar and Porbandar. Indian Railways’ proposal to double the broad gauge line between Palanpur and Samakhiali has received government backing. The doubling will benefit the districts of Kutch, Patan and Banaskantha in the state of Gujarat.

Road
National Highway 27 connecting Beawar in Rajasthan with Radhanpur in Gujarat passes through Deesa-Palanpur, thus connecting it with the cities of (Sirohi), (Udaipur) and (Pali). State Highways SH 712, SH 132 pass through Palanpur and connect it with nearby towns in Gujarat. State Highway SH 41 connects it with Mehsana & Ahmedabad.

Air
The nearest Airport is the Deesa Airport, originally built to serve the princely state of Palanpur. It is just 26 km from Palanpur city. The nearest International Airport is Sardar Vallabhbhai Patel International Airport, Ahmedabad which is 139 km far from Palanpur.

Surrounding Cites

Gallery

Nearby places of interest
 Rani ki vav, Patan
 Sun Temple, Modhera
 Dantiwada Dam
 Balaram Palace Resort
A temple of Dharmata, who is a patron goddess of Sundhiya family is situated near Balaram Mahadev Temple.

References

Cities and towns in Banaskantha district